Fitoor (Madness, Obsession, Passion) is a 2016 Indian Hindi-language romantic drama film directed by Abhishek Kapoor, produced by Siddharth Roy Kapur, and written by Kapoor and Supratik Sen based on Charles Dickens' 1861 novel Great Expectations. The film features Tabu, Katrina Kaif and Aditya Roy Kapur in leading roles. Filming began in Kashmir in November 2014. 

Fitoor released on 12 February 2016, and proved to be an underwhelming success at the box-office; however, the film's music, cinematography and performances of the cast received praise, with Tabu's performance receiving high critical acclaim.

Plot
Noor, a thirteen-year-old Kashmiri schoolboy from a lower middle-class family, works as a part-time errand boy in order to earn some pocket money. His employer is Begum Hazrat Jahaan, a rich widow who lives in perpetual mourning and never leaves her sprawling but run-down mansion. She therefore needs an errand boy to do the shopping, go to the post office, the bank and so forth, and for this she employs Noor, the son of a respectable but rather poor family. Noor becomes infatuated with the Begum's daughter, Firdaus, who is the same age as him. The Begum observes and disapproves of her daughter being so friendly with the dashing errand boy. Nevertheless, Noor and Firdaus grow closer until the Begum sends her daughter abroad to a posh boarding school, insulting and taunting Noor as she tells him the news. Meanwhile, it is revealed that Begum Hazrat Jahan had been left heartbroken in her youth by her lover, presumably Firdaus's father.

Some years later, Noor is a grown-up young man with artistic talent. He wants to go to a prestigious art school in Delhi but lacks money. He suddenly receives a scholarship to attend that art school, sponsored by an anonymous benefactor who has seen his work at a patrons' symposium organized by the school. He moves to Delhi, where he encounters Firdaus and the Begum. Due to some coincidence, Noor begins to believe that it is the Begum who is paying for him to go to art school. By this time, Firdaus is engaged to Bilal, a Pakistani diplomat. However, there is an immediate rapport between her and Noor even after so many years. The Begum habitually treats Noor like an underling or errand boy, and after she observes the rapport, she makes her behavior towards him even more peremptory and insulting. This is acceptable to Noor, who thinks that beneath her tough exterior, she is actually his patroness. Noor's feelings for Firdaus have not changed, and they begin a friendship, perhaps a relationship. The Begum sees that Noor is by now a successful artist who moves in posh circles, and she slowly begins to realise her mistake, but she is still adamant that Firdaus should marry Bilal. A flashback of the Begum and her lover, Mufti, who left her pregnant and ran away with all her jewels, indicates why she is so adamant that her daughter should treat Noor with maximal wariness and marry Bilal, the conventional, safe choice.

Noor travels for an art show in London, where he finds out that his art scholarship is being sponsored by Moazzam, a Kashmiri terrorist who he had saved when he was young, and not by the Begum. Noor is deeply alarmed that he is merely a pawn in Moazzam's scheme of some sort. But he is even more shocked and upset to realize that the Begum has been playing him all along. Noor confronts the Begum. She denies manipulating Noor and bursts into a fit of rage, where she rants about her former lover Mufti. Noor realizes that she has been seeking redemption by transferring her desire for vengeance against Mufti towards him (Noor) and satisfying her man-hatred (misandry) by tormenting him and plotting to destroy him. She is a deeply diseased woman who hates all mankind and cannot bear to see other young people happy, not even her own daughter. Noor goes back to the gallery and burns his artwork, which was related to the memory of Firdaus. Another flashback of the Begum shows that in fact, she lost her baby (fathered by Mufti), and Firdaus is her adopted daughter. She wakes up from that semi-dream distraught at what Noor has said about her bitter and diseased inner self and she then commits suicide.

At her funeral, a grieving Firdaus (who remains engaged to Bilal, and still intends to marry him, as per the Begum's ardent desire) opens the pendant which the Begum always wore around her neck. She is astonished to find inside it a picture of a happy young couple: Mufti and the Begum. She realizes that the Begum has bever been able to get over her love for Mufti, despite the fact that he was a horrendous fraudster. Noor suddenly realizes that she herself will never be able to get over her love for Noor, who genuinely loves her and is an honest and good man. With this realization, Firdaus decides to break her engagement with Bilal and make her life with Noor.

Cast

Production

Development
In October 2013, Disney UTV announced its upcoming production Fitoor, a Bollywood adaptation of Charles Dickens' novel Great Expectations to be directed by Abhishek Kapoor with Aditya Roy Kapur and Katrina Kaif signed as the lead pair. Rekha was confirmed for the role of Begum Hazrat in January 2014 but later opted out and was replaced by Tabu. The film also stars Aditi Rao Hydari, Rahul Bhat, Akshay Oberoi, Lara Dutta, Suchitra Pillai and Andy Von Eich in supporting roles.

Filming
Principal photography began in Srinagar, Kashmir in November 2014 and continued at Nishat Bagh on the banks of the Dal Lake in Srinagar in January 2015. The film was also shot at Humayun's Tomb in Nizamuddin East, Delhi in March 2015. The remaining portion of the film was shot in Mehboob Studios, Filmistan Studios and Film City, Mumbai from April to September 2015. In September 2015, the cast and crew flew off to Poland to shoot the last leg of the film at the Goetz Palace, Brzesko and Warsaw's traditional and contemporary art galleries. On 2 October, the shooting of the project was completed.

Soundtrack

Amit Trivedi composed the songs while Swanand Kirkire wrote the lyrics for the film. Hitesh Sonik composed the film's score. The first song "Yeh Fitoor Mera" sung by Arijit Singh was released on 7 January 2016. The second song "Pashmina" was released on 14 January 2016. The official soundtrack released on 18 January 2016 by Zee Music Company.

References

External links
 
 
 

2016 films
2010s Hindi-language films
2016 romantic drama films
Indian romantic drama films
Films set in Jammu and Kashmir
Films set in Delhi
Films set in India
Films based on Great Expectations
Films shot in India
Films shot in Jammu and Kashmir
Films shot in Delhi
Films shot in Warsaw
Films shot in Poland
UTV Motion Pictures films
Films scored by Amit Trivedi
Films directed by Abhishek Kapoor